Tozluyaka is a Turkish television series, the first episode of which was broadcast on 27 June 2022, shot by NTC Media. Emre Kınay, Dolunay Soysert and Tayanç Ayaydın are in the lead roles in the series.

Cast and characters

Episodes

Season 1 (2022-)

References

External links 
 Tozluyaka on FOX's official website
 
 
Turkish drama television series
2022 Turkish television series debuts